Wychbury Ring is an Iron Age hill fort located on Wychbury Hill, near Hagley, Stourbridge, on the border of West Midlands and Worcestershire in the English Midlands.

Description

It has two sets of ramparts and ditches. There are fortified entrances at the east and south west.

Small bronze rings, including an Iron Age terret, were found in the fort in 1884, and Roman coins and masonry have been found nearby, suggesting a possible site of a later Roman Villa. Investigations in 1924 reported a  annexe to the south and a nearby Iron Age field system, but no trace of either remain.

Images

References

External links 	
 

Hill forts in the West Midlands (county)
Hill forts in Worcestershire
Iron Age sites in England